Honeymoon, Italian Style (Italian: Viaggio di nozze all'italiana) is a 1966 Italian-Spanish comedy film directed by  Mario Amendola and starring Tony Russel, Concha Velasco and Ferruccio Amendola. The film's sets were designed by the art director Francisco Canet.

Cast
 Tony Russel as Barone Frescobaldi 
 Concha Velasco as Rosetta de Curtis 
 Ferruccio Amendola  as Pasquale 
 Elio Crovetto as Funzionario al Casinò 
 Ana María Custodio  as donna di Camilo 
 Luigi De Filippo  as Camilluccio 
 Alberto Farnese  as Portiere dell'Hotel 
 Litz Kibiska as La Bionda 
 Anna Maestri  as Pallina 
 Renzo Montagnani as Nicola 
 Antonio Ozores as Salvatore Catella 
 George Rigaud  as Barone Luigi 
 Carlo Rizzo  as Direttore dell'Hotel 
 Rosita Rizzo as Donna Carmela 
 Marisa Solinas as Gina 
 Toni Ucci  as Pallino

References

Bibliography 
Small, Pauline. Sophia Loren: Moulding the Star. Intellect Books, 2009.

External links 
 

1966 films
Italian comedy films
Spanish comedy films
1966 comedy films
1960s Italian-language films
Films directed by Mario Amendola
Films with screenplays by Mario Amendola
1960s Italian films